Acetylpyrazine is an organic compound with the chemical formula . It is a yellow-brown powder at room temperature. Chemically, acetylpyrazine is a pyrazine and a ketone.

Acetylpyrazine is found in foods such as seeds, nuts and meats. It is used in frozen dairy products such as ice cream. It is considered generally recognized as safe by the U.S. Food and Drug Administration.

References

Pyrazines
Aromatic ketones